Eve Brodlique Summers (Brodlique; pen names, Willice Wharton, Peg Woffington, Evelyn; 1867 – 10 October 1949) was a British-born Canadian/American author and journalist. One of the best-known newspaper women on the Continent, she filled every position from reporter to editor. Yet, she belonged to the group of literary journalists, as by her rhymes and stories for the leading U.S. magazines, she built up a national reputation.

Early life and education
Eve (sometimes, "Eva") Hadday Brodlique was born in Cornwall, England, 1867. Her parents were Frederick Cornish Brodlique, and Elizabeth Hadday (or Haddy). There was one sibling, a sister, Clara Elizabeth Brodlique. Jean Blewett was Brodlique's cousin. The family emigrated to London, Ontario when Eve was young.

Brodlique was educated in Canada, England, and the United States.

Career
Her professional career began while she was yet a school girl at her home in London, Ontario, from which place she sent occasional specials to the Toronto papers. Beginning when she was 17 years old, and using the pen name, "Willice Wharton", Brodlique was the special representative for the London Advertiser at the House of Commons at Ottawa, being the first and the only woman who did regular telegraphic political work from the Dominion Parliament. This work in the press gallery lasted for three sessions. Although holding decided political opinions of her own, she made unbiased reports, and was equally poular with the representatives of both parties.

When Brodlique thought about transferring her activities to the United States, she thought that New York City would be the place to continue her journalism career, but an opportunity came to travel with a friend to Chicago, and she took it. Brodlique arrived in Chicago in 1894, and started studying at the University of Chicago. Two years later, she became a writer at the Chicago Times-Herald, becoming its women's department editor, a post she held for a number of years. At the same time, she was writing for the Chicago Evening Post. In 1897, she represented the Chicago Times-Herald at the Diamond Jubilee of Queen Victoria in London, England. She was also a contributor to the Cosmopolitan, Munsey's, Frank Leslie's, and McClure's.

Brodlique was successful writing editorials, specials, poems, romances, and plays. A Training School for Lovers, the title of her first play, was a one-act presentation of one woman's sacrifice of her heart's desire to secure the happiness of another woman. Her poems had a simplicity and directness of feeling. There was an under-current of sadness in her verses that seemed unnatural for one so young unless they understood how Brodlique had suffered: that she was the last of her name; that she had buried everyone in her family; and that she felt alone in the world. She also wrote a volume of short stories. Of her short stories, the most popular were her representations of life among the fisher-folk of rock-girt Cornwall. Of these stories, Blewett said:— "No one can hope to master Cornish humor or Cornish sentiment, to say nothing of Cornish dialect, who has not the birthright to a knowledge of these difficult things as has Eve Brodlique."

Brodlique was a member of the Chicago Woman's Club. In 1893, she served as corresponding secretary of the Woman's National Press League.
In 1897, she was elected president of the Chicago Press League. Brodlique was one of the most versatile writers in the league. She could jump from politics to fashion, from prose to poetry, from humor to pathos, and write a dramatic criticism as well as an article on art. She was "Peg Woffington" of "The Matinee Girl" column in a popular afternoon paper, and once a week, "Evelyn" on fashions, and nearly every day, had about two columns on a bit of everything without a signature.

During the 1897 World's Fair, she belonged to the editorial staff of the Chicago Post, and kept to the fore the Canadian exhibit and the people from Canada who attended the fair. She also attended the Paris Peace Conference of 1919–1920.

Personal life
Broadlique returned to Canada in August 1896, touring Quebec and Ontario.

In 1899, she married Leland Laflin Summers (d. 1927), Consulting Engineer of the Florence and Cripple Creek railroad company and the La Bella Mining company of Denver, Colorado. Afterwards, they lived in Denver. They had one child, a son, Leland Llewellyn Brodlique Summers (1903–1948).

Brodlique resided at "Summerslea", an estate on Long Island. She died in a sanitarium in Saugerties, New York, October 10, 1949. Burial was in Woodstock, New York.

Selected works

Plays
 A Training School for Lovers, 1896
 A Tangled Web, 1897
 Rue, 1900

Notes

References

External links
 

1867 births
1949 deaths
20th-century Canadian writers
20th-century Canadian women writers
20th-century Canadian journalists
20th-century American writers
20th-century American women writers
20th-century American journalists
20th-century American newspaper editors
Journalists from Illinois
Writers from Cornwall
Writers from Chicago
English emigrants to Canada
Canadian emigrants to the United States
Editors of Illinois newspapers
20th-century pseudonymous writers
Pseudonymous women writers